The Stokes operator, named after George Gabriel Stokes, is an unbounded linear operator used in the theory of partial differential equations, specifically in the fields of fluid dynamics and electromagnetics.

Definition

If we define  as the Leray projection onto divergence free vector fields, then the Stokes Operator  is defined by

where  is the Laplacian.

Properties

For a given domain  which is open, bounded, and has  boundary, the Stokes operator  is a self-adjoint positive-definite operator with respect to the  inner product.  It has an orthonormal basis of eigenfunctions  corresponding to eigenvalues  which satisfy

Note that the smallest eigenvalue is unique and non-zero. These properties allow one to define powers of the Stokes operator. Let  be a real number. We define  by its action on :

The inverse  of the Stokes operator is a bounded, compact, self-adjoint operator in the space , where  is the trace operator.  Furthermore,  is injective.

References 

Constantin, Peter and Foias, Ciprian. Navier-Stokes Equations, University of Chicago Press, (1988)

Linear algebra
Differential equations